Myanmar National Literature Awards are awards presented to a Burmese author who has published a particularly lauded piece or body of work. There are awards for forms of writing ranging from poetry to novels. Many awards are also dedicated to a certain genre of fiction or non-fiction writing (such as science fiction or politics). Most literary awards come with a corresponding award ceremony.

Background

The Myanmar National Literature Awards have been presented since 1970. They are for the best works published in the previous year in each category as determined by a selection committee from Sarpay Beikman ("Palace of Literature"), a division of the Ministry of Information that is concerned with promoting books in Burmese and other national languages. Sarpay Beikman also gives the Sarpay Beikman Manuscript Awards for unpublished works that are submitted in manuscript.
In recent years the genres covered by Sarpay Beikman Manuscript and National Literary Awards have been gradually extended and the number of awards increased.
As of 2007 there were twelve types of award, of which the recently instituted lifetime achievement award was the most prestigious.
The awards complement the privately sponsored Sayawun Tin Shwe Award, Pakokku U Ohn Pe literary award, Thuta Swesone literary award and Tun Foundation award.

The award has been given since 1962 for distinguished work in categories that include:

Myanmar National Literature Award for Fiction
Myanmar National Literature Award for Collected Short Stories
Myanmar National Literature Award for Translation
Myanmar National Literature Award for Collected Poems
Myanmar National Literature Award for Political Literature
Myanmar National Literature Award for Historical Documentary
Myanmar National Literature Award for Lifetime Achievement Award

Maung Wuntha, a member of the selection committee for the National Literary Awards and a veteran journalist died on 11 August 2013.

List

1972
 Mya Than Tint, Translation: War and Peace

1977
Kyaw Win , Novel:Nout Aww Naga
Nu Yin, Poems
Hla Myo Nwe,Fiction

1978
 Mya Than Tint, Translation: Gone with the Wind

1979

1986
 Moe Moe (Inya) for Moe Moe's Short Stories
 Maung Nyein Thu for Mya Ah Phuutwe Thit Thit Waie and Youth Short Stories

1987

Saya Zawgyi for Ancient Bagan and Other Poems

1988
 Mya Than Tint, Translation: Dream of the Red Chamber

1989
Saw Mon Nyin, Myanmar Women’s Clothing and Hairstyles

1992
National Literary Awards for 1992 were announced on 2 December 1993. They were:

No awards were made for Novels, Drama, Youth Literature, Translation (general knowledge), General Knowledge (science) or Political Literature.

1995

Fiction|| Saya Pe Myint ||

2003
Awards for 2003 were presented in December 2004. 
The Lifelong National Literary Award was won by writer Htay Maung. 
Other winners of National Literary Awards were Hsaung Win Lat, Khin Khin Htoo, Salin Phone Kyaw, Daw Mi Mi Lay, Maung Thit Sar, Myinmu Maung Naing Moe, Than Aung (Anyamyay), Hlaing Thin, Maung Tun Thu, Ma Kyan, Kyaw Oo, Naing Shwe Moe, Kyu Kyu Thin and Dr Ma Tin Win.

2005

Award winners in 2005 were:

2007
The 2007 award winners included:

2008
The 2008 awards were presented at the Ministry of Information on 31 December 2009. Winners were:

2009

The 2009 awards were presented at the hall of the Ministry of Information in Nay Pyi Taw on 31 December 2010. 
The Lifetime Achievement for National Literary Award was presented to Dr Khin Maung Nyunt.
Other winners of literary awards were Linka Yi Kyaw, Maung Cheint, Maung Ni Win, Maung Khin Min (Danubyu), U Kyaw Than (Phekon), Min Shwe Min (Insein), Ye Tint, Ma Kyan, Pho Swe (Timber Enterprise) and U Saw Aung Hla Tun.

2010
2010 award winners were:

2011
2011 award winners were:

2012
The 2012 awards was presented at the National Theatre, Yangon on 3 December 2013. 2012 award winners were:

2013
The 2013 awards were presented at the National Theatre, Yangon on 22 November 2014. 2013 award winners were:

See also
Burmese literature

References

1970 establishments in Burma
Burmese literary awards